{{Infobox person
| name        = Arjun Deo Charan 
| image       = ImageArjundeocharan.jpg
| alt         =
| caption     =
| birth_date  = 
| birth_place = Mathania, India
| death_date  = 
| death_place =
| nationality = Indian
| other_names =
|
| known_for   =
| occupation  = Playwright, theatre directorFounder Rammat Theatre Group"
| years_active = 1974–present
| children    = Aashish Deo Charan 
| employer =
| organization              =
|awards= Sangeet Natak Akademi Award in Playwright, 1992
}}
Dr. Arjun Deo Charan (born 1954) is a Rajasthani poet, critic, playwright, theatre director and translator. A prominent figure in Indian theatre, he is among the country's top 10 theatre personalities.

 Early life 
Charan was born on 10 May 1954 in the village of Mathania, Jodhpur. His father Renvat Dan Charan also was an eminent Rajasthani poet and socialist, who had won Sahitya Akademi Award for his notable work Uchhalo. Charan has been the Head of Department of Rajasthani Language in the Jai Narain Vyas University, Jodhpur. He has been selected as Chairman of Rajasthan Sangeet Natak Akademi, Jodhpur on 26 November 2011 for three years.

The K. K. Birla Foundation has awarded the 21st Bihari Puraskar for 2011 to Arjun Deo Charan for his Rajasthani poetry collection Ghar Tau Ek Nam Hai Bhrosai Rau.

He has been awarded by Sahitya Akademi, Delhi for his book Dharam Judh in 1992. He also has been awarded by Rajasthan Sangeet Natak Akademi for his contribution to the Rajasthani language theatre in 1999.

Arjun Deo Charan is the founder of Rammat Theatre Group, Jodhpur, which is one of the prestigious theatre group of country. Charan's plays have been performed on several National and International theatre festivals including Bharat Rang Mahotsav.

Charan has performed his play in Karachi, Pakistan.

Charan's play Meh Raja The Parja was performed in 3rd Rajasthani Annual International Art Festival in Jaipur.

 Published works 

 Charan, Arjun Dev. Virasat (in Hindi). Vani Prakashan.
 Charan, Arjun Deo. (2021). Pancham Veda (in Hindi). Gayatri Parakashan.
 Charan, Arjun Deo. (2022). Jagadamba (in Hindi). Gayatri Parakashan. 
 Charan, Arjun Dev (1 January 2003). Adhunik Punjabi Kavita (in Hindi). Sahitya Akademi Publications. .
 Charan, Arjun Dev (1 January 2006). Dharmyuddh (in Hindi). Sāhitya Akādemī. .
 Charan, Arjun Dev (1 January 2003). Satyaprakāśa Jośī (in Hindi). Sāhitya Akādemī. .
 Cāraṇa, Arjunadeva (2002). Bagata rī bārakhaṛī (in Hindi). Kavi Prakāśana. .
 Cāraṇa, Arjunadeva (1998). Rājasthānī kahāṇī, paramparā-vikāsa'' (in Hindi). Rājasthānī Sāhitya Saṃsthāna.

Awards

 Rajasthani Sahitya Akademi – Award, 1980
 Sahitya Akademi, New Delhi Award, 1992. 
 Suryamal Mishran Shikhar Award of Rajasthani Bhasa Sahitya Evam Sanskriti Akademi, 1997
 Rajasthan Sangeet Natak Akademi Award, 1999
 Maru-Parampara Samman, 2004.
 Bihari Puraskar, K.K Birla Foundation, 2011
 Sangeet Natak Akademi Award, New Delhi, 2012

References

 Language has never been a deterrent

External links
 धर्मयुद्ध (Dharmayuddh)
 Vipathaga

People from Jodhpur
Poets from Rajasthan
Rajasthani-language writers
Recipients of the Sahitya Akademi Award in Rajasthani
Living people
20th-century Indian poets
1954 births
Charan
Recipients of the Sangeet Natak Akademi Award